Julian Rubinstein  is an American journalist, documentary filmmaker and educator. He is best known for his longform magazine journalism and his non-fiction books, Ballad of the Whiskey Robber, which chronicles the life of one of the world's most popular living folk heroes and The Holly: Five Bullets, One Gun and the Struggle to Save an American Neighborhood, a multi-generational story of activism and gang violence in a northeast Denver community. While reporting The Holly, he began filming THE HOLLY, a feature documentary, which captures significant problems in a federal anti-gang effort and the targeted takedown of an activist.

Early life
Rubinstein was born in the Bronx in 1968. He is the son of the psychiatrist David Rubinstein and the aerospace engineer Diane Rubinstein. The family moved to Denver from New York City in 1971 when David Rubinstein accepted a residency at the University of Colorado Medical School. Soon afterward, Dr. Rubinstein was drafted into the Air Force and became the base psychiatrist at Denver's now-closed Lowry Air Force Base, retiring as a major. Dr. Rubinstein was an attending at several Denver-area hospitals. At age 49, he was diagnosed with cancer and became known posthumously for his work counseling residents at Hospice of Metro Denver who didn't know he too was dying. Diane Rubinstein worked much of her career on government contracts, including missile defense, and retired from Raytheon.

After living in Denver for several years and Pueblo for a year while Dr. Rubinstein worked at the state mental hospital, the family moved to south Denver, where Julian Rubinstein attended Cherry Creek High School. He went on to receive a B.A. in Political Science from Emory University in 1991 and an M.S. in Journalism from Columbia University's Graduate School of Journalism, in 1992.

Rubinstein's younger brother, Dan Rubinstein, is the elected district attorney in Mesa County, Colorado.

Career
Rubinstein began his career as an agate clerk in the Washington Post Sports section, and wrote for the Sports and Style section, where he did music reviews and features. In 1994, he was hired as a reporter at Sports Illustrated, where he worked for four years, covering tennis, NFL, NBA and extreme sports. In 1996, he worked with senior writer Gary Smith on "Crime and Punishment: The Saga of Richie Parker, which won the 1997  National Magazine Award for Feature Writing. In 1998, Rubinstein went to work for CBS Sports at the Nagano Winter Olympics as the co-editor-in-chief of a daily  publication.

Afterward, Rubinstein became a freelance journalist, making a name as a reporter who was able to find overlooked or mistold stories, and land difficult interviews. His story, "They Call It Suicide", published in Rolling Stone in 2000, was reported over several weeks in Mato Grosso do Sul in which he gained the trust of a Guarani Indian tribe fleeing the reservation in fear of its chief. International news stories reported that the tribe had the highest suicide rate in the world, but Rubinstein discovered evidence that the chief was murdering his own people.

Rubinstein wrote what has been called the best profile of tennis player John McEnroe. The unabridged version of the profile appeared on the literary sports journalism site, SportsJones.com and espn.com, and an abridged version of the story was published in The New York Times Magazine in 2000. Rubinstein also chronicled the Hells Angels war with a rival biker gang, the Rock Machine, in Canada, and profiled the Hasidic international ecstasy kingpin, Jacob "Cookie" Orgad, a story selected for Best American Crime Writing.

In 2004, Rubinstein published his first non-fiction book Ballad of the Whiskey Robber, about the Hungarian bank robber and folk hero Attila Ambrus. The book was published in six languages and was a number one bestseller in Hungary. In the U.S., it was the winner of Borders' 2005 "Original Voices" Non-fiction Book of the Year and was a finalist for the 2005 Edgar Allan Poe Award for Best Fact Crime book and the 2005 Anthony Award for best Non-fiction book. A cabaret-style recording of the book was a finalist for the 2007 Audie Awards for Best Audio Book. The recording stars Eric Bogosian, Demetri Martin, former U.N. Ambassador Samantha Power, Gary Shteyngart, Jonathan Ames, Arthur Phillips, Darin Strauss, and Tommy Ramone. Warner Bros. and Johnny Depp optioned the book for a film.

In 2013, Rubinstein's story "Operation Easter" appeared in the New Yorker for which Rubinstein gained access to illegal egg collectors in the U.K. The story was named one of the "5 Most Entertaining Stories of the Year" by Longreads, and was listed as a Notable story of the Year by Best American Science and Nature Writing. In 2006, he wrote about his relationship with his father, David Rubinstein, in 5280, Denver's city magazine, which was cited as a Notable Story in 2007 Best American Essays.

In 2021, after seven years of work, his book, The Holly: Five Bullets, One Gun and the Struggle to Save an American Neighborhood was released to critical acclaim. In a starred review, Booklist called it "a shattering piece of investigative journalism involving street gangs, race relations and law enforcement." The New York Times Book Review named it an Editors' Choice. Rubinstein appeared on NPR's All Things Considered with Michel Martin. The book was the winner of the 2022 Colorado Book Award for general nonfiction.

In 2022, the documentary film he directed while reporting The Holly caught the attention of Academy Award-winner Adam McKay, who offered to come on as an Executive Producer. Other executive producers include Damon Davis, Lana Garland, and Tony Hardmon, along with Denver-based producer donnie l. betts, Sarah Dowland and Dia Sokol Savage. The film premiered at Telluride Mountainfilm in May 2022 and won the Audience Choice Award for best documentary.  Because of the project's implication of wealthy and influential people and entities in Denver and their connection to street violence in a gentrifying community, Rubinstein faced threats and falsehoods about the work and had to leave Denver for his safety in 2021 and 2022. The Denver Gazette wrote that Rubinstein's film was "a documentary that the most powerful people in Denver don't want to see and don't want you to see, referring to The Holly project as "Denver's very own Bonfire of the Vanities." Colorado College and the University of Denver's Media, Film and Journalism Studies Department partnered to present Rubinstein in conversation with Pulitzer Prize-winner Wesley Lowery in an event called "Battle for Truth." The Sentinel of Aurora, where Elijah McClain was killed and where Denver's gang violence has spilled into, called the film "a riveting look at metro police, gang violence and politics."

Rubinstein worked as an adjunct professor of journalism at Columbia University, and also as a senior producer for the school's Dart Center for Journalism and Trauma. In 2021, he was named a Visiting Professor of the Practice in Documentary Journalism at the University of Denver.

Personal life
Rubinstein has worked with at-risk youth at Groundwork in Brooklyn, and at Friends For Youth in Colorado. His mentee Ngor Monday was killed in a shootout in 2019.

Awards 
2022 Winner, Audience Award, Best Documentary, Denver Film Festival 

2022 Winner, Jury Prize, Best Documentary, Santa Fe International Film Festival, THE HOLLY

2022 Winner, High Plains Book Award for Creative Nonfiction, The Holly: Five Bullets, One Gun and the Struggle to Save an American Neighborhood

2022 Winner, Colorado Book Award for General Nonfiction, The Holly: Five Bullets, One Gun and the Struggle to Save an American Neighborhood

2022 Winner, Audience Choice Award, Telluride Mountainfilm, THE HOLLY (documentary film)

2021 Booklist Editors' Choice: Best of 2021, The Holly: Five Bullets One Gun and the Struggle to Save an American Neighborhood

2021 New York Times Editors' Choice, The Holly: Five Bullets, One Gun and the Struggle to Save an American Neighborhood

2014 Best American Science and Nature Writing, Notable Story of the Year, Operation Easter, New Yorker

2013 Best of Longform, 5 Most Entertaining Stories of the Year, for Operation Easter, New Yorker

2009 Lowell Thomas Travel Writing Award, Bronze Medal for Aspen feature story, Travel + Leisure

2007 Best American Essays, Notable Story of the Year, Final Cut, 5280

2007 Finalist, Audie Award, Best Audio Book of the Year, Finalist for Ballad of the Whiskey Robber

2005 Finalist, Edgar Allan Poe Award, Best Fact Crime Book, for Ballad of the Whiskey Robber

2005 Winner, Borders "Original Voices" Best Non-fiction Book of the Year, Winner for Ballad of the Whiskey Robber

2005 Anthony Award for Best Nonfiction Book, Finalist for Ballad of the Whiskey Robber

2002 Best American Crime Writing, Official Selection, X-Files, Details

2002 Best American Sports Writing, Notable Story of the Year, Being John McEnroe, espn.com / New York Times Magazine

2001 Online Journalism Association, Best Feature Writing, Finalist, for Being John McEnroe, espn.com

2000 Women's Sports Foundation, Best Journalism, Slam It Baby, Salon.com

1999 Best American Sports Writing, Notable Story of the Year, The Chosen One, Gear

Bibliography

Books

Rubinstein, Julian (2009). "Leaving Home." Published in Writing Away From Home, International Authors In Brussels, cahier, het beschrijf, pp 141–145.
Rubinstein, Julian (2021). The Holly: Five Bullets, One Gun and the Struggle to Save an American Neighborhood.

Film
THE HOLLY (2022).

Articles

Rubinstein, Julian (January 27, 2000). "Being John McEnroe." The New York Times Magazine
Rubinstein, Julian (June 8, 2000). "They Call It Suicide." Rolling Stone
Rubinstein, Julian (September, 2001.) "X-Files." Details

References

External links
THE HOLLY documentary film website
The Holly Official Book Website
"The Shocking Story of 'The Holly' Continues to Rile Denver's Power Structure,"—The Denver Post, Sept 8, 2022
"A documentary that the most powerful people in Denver don't want you to see,"—Denver Gazette, May 21, 2022
"Battle for Truth: A conversation between award-winning journalists Wesley Lowery and Julian Rubinstein,"—DU Clarion, Feb 28, 2022
Pulitzer Prize-winner Wesley Lowery and Julian Rubinstein in conversation at Colorado College about The Holly, covering vulnerable communities, and unseen problems with policing including the misuse of informants and corruption in America's federal anti-gang program. (Feb 15, 2022)
NPR's Michel Martin interviews Julian Rubinstein on All Things Considered about The Holly
Julian Rubinstein talks about The Holly on the New York Times Book Review podcast
Ballad of the Whiskey Robber website
Julian Rubinstein performs "Ballad of the Whiskey Robber" at the  Festival in Germany.
Julian Rubinstein Talks About the Hells Angels on the O'Reilly Factor
Interview with Julian Rubinstein from Media Bistro
Documentary Video of Julian Rubinstein Visiting Attila Ambrus in prison in Hungary

American male journalists
Living people
1968 births